The siege of Port-au-Prince took place during the Haitian Revolution.

Rebellion of the settlers 
On January 25, 1793, the settlers, led by Borel, revolt against the commissioners Sonthonax and Polverel. The royalist "Grand blancs" settlers and wealthy slave owners and the "Petit blancs", modest or poor, or formerly, Republican settlers, unite in their common opposition to mulattoes and free colored people. The settlers arm their slaves, join forces with the soldiers of the Artois regiment and make themselves masters of Port-au-Prince. The insurgents then send a letter to London declaring themselves ready to pass under the suzerainty of the Kingdom of Great Britain in exchange for the conservation of their laws.

Siege 
Troops loyal to the commissioners commanded by generals Lassale, European, and Beauvais, mulatto, then lay siege to Port-au-Prince. For their part, the representatives Sonthonax and Polverel establish their base at the port of Saint-Marc, they take the head of the navy and attack on the side of the sea. On April 12 the forces of the commissioners launch a general attack by sea and land. The commissioners ship is badly damaged by rebel cannons and a fire breaks out, but it is extinguished.

Intensely bombarded with 4,000 to 5,000 bullets, Port-au-Prince capitulates on April 14, 1793. Borel, the leader of the insurgents, fled to Jamaica, his slaves are disarmed and return to their plantations.

Notes

Bibliography 
 
 
 
 
 

Conflicts in 1793
Port-au-Prince 1793
Port-au-Prince 1793
Haitian Revolution
1793 in France
1793 in North America
History of Port-au-Prince